Iazu may refer to:

 Iazu (crater), a crater on Mars
 Iazu, a village in Cojasca Commune, Dâmbovița County, Romania
 Iazu, a village in Scânteia Commune, Ialomița County, Romania
 Iazu, a village in Măgurele Commune, Prahova County, Romania